Siripong Siripool (born 9 September 1965) is a Thai badminton player. He competed at the 1992 Summer Olympics and the 1996 Summer Olympics.

References

External links
 

1965 births
Living people
Siripong Siripool
Siripong Siripool
Badminton players at the 1992 Summer Olympics
Badminton players at the 1996 Summer Olympics
Siripong Siripool
Siripong Siripool
Medalists at the 1998 Asian Games
Asian Games medalists in badminton
Badminton players at the 1986 Asian Games
Badminton players at the 1990 Asian Games
Badminton players at the 1994 Asian Games
Badminton players at the 1998 Asian Games
Siripong Siripool